Roquan Daevon Smith (born April 8, 1997) is an American football inside linebacker for the Baltimore Ravens of the National Football League (NFL). He played college football at Georgia. Smith became the first Georgia Bulldog to win the Butkus Award.

Early years
Smith attended Macon County High School in Montezuma, Georgia, where he played football for the Bulldogs. He originally committed to the University of California, Los Angeles (UCLA) to play college football but changed his commitment to the University of Georgia.

College career
While at the University of Georgia, Smith played college football under head coaches Mark Richt and Kirby Smart. As a true freshman at Georgia in 2015, Smith played in 12 games and recorded 20 tackles. As a sophomore in 2016, he started 10 of 13 games, recording 95 tackles.

In 2017, Smith was named MVP of the SEC Championship Game, as well as SEC Defensive Player of the Year by the Associated Press. He also became the first Georgia Bulldog to win the Butkus Award. Smith decided to forgo his final year of eligibility and entered the 2018 NFL Draft.

Professional career

Chicago Bears

2018 season
Smith was drafted by the Chicago Bears with the eighth overall pick in the first-round of the 2018 NFL Draft.

His contract signing was significantly delayed due to contract disputes between the Bears and Smith's agency CAA Football over language in his rookie contract stating whether his guaranteed money would be reclaimed by the team if he was suspended due to the NFL's new rule outlawing contact leading with the helmet. CAA argued for wording that would protect Smith's guaranteed earnings, while the Bears preferred for decisions to be determined by the league, a situation that was exacerbated by skepticism surrounding the rule and the frequency of tackling in Smith's role. On August 14, the Bears signed Smith to a fully guaranteed four-year, $18.47 million contract that included a signing bonus of $11.51 million. He was the last first-round pick in his draft class to sign with his team.

In his NFL debut in Week 1 against the Green Bay Packers on NBC Sunday Night Football, Smith recorded a sack on the Packers' quarterback DeShone Kizer on his first career snap. In Week 6 against the Miami Dolphins, Smith made 13 tackles. In Week 9 against the Buffalo Bills, Smith made 13 tackles as the Bears won the game 41–9. In Week 10 against the Detroit Lions, he made 10 tackles and sacked quarterback Matthew Stafford, while the Bears won 34–22, while also leading the team in tackles in both of these weeks. In Week 12 against the Detroit Lions, he made 11 tackles and sacked quarterback Stafford in a 23–16 win.
In Week 14 against the Los Angeles Rams, Smith made six tackles and recorded his first career interception off Jared Goff and returned the ball 22 yards to the four-yard line as the Bears won 15–6. In Week 15 against the Green Bay Packers, Smith made 10 tackles in a 24–17 win. In Week 16 against the San Francisco 49ers, Smith made nine tackles and sacked Nick Mullens in a 14–9 win. On December 30, during a Week 17 game against the Minnesota Vikings, Smith had six tackles as the Bears defeated the Vikings 24–10.

On January 6, 2019, in the Bears' 16–15 loss to the Philadelphia Eagles in a Wild Card playoff game, Smith led the team with seven tackles and made an interception off Nick Foles.

Smith finished the season with 121 tackles, five sacks, five passes defended, and one interception. He received an overall grade of 67.4 from Pro Football Focus in 2018, which ranked him as the 39th highest grade among all qualifying linebackers, and was selected as Pro Bowl alternate.

2019 season
In Week 2 against the Denver Broncos, Smith recorded a team high 13 tackles as the Bears won 16–14. In Week 11 against the Los Angeles Rams on Sunday Night Football, Smith recorded a team high 11 tackles and intercepted a pass thrown by Jared Goff in the 17–7 loss. In Week 13 against the Detroit Lions on Thanksgiving Day, Smith recorded a team high 15 tackles and sacked rookie quarterback David Blough twice in the 24–20 win. On December 9, 2019, Smith was placed on injured reserve after suffering a torn pectoral in Week 14.

2020 season
In Week 9 against the Tennessee Titans, Smith recorded a team-high 11 tackles and sacked Ryan Tannehill once during the 24–17 loss. In Week 10 against the Minnesota Vikings on Monday Night Football, Smith recorded a team-high 14 tackles and sacked Kirk Cousins once during the 19–13 loss. In Week 14 against the Houston Texans, Smith led the team with 12 tackles and two sacks during the 36–7 win.

During the Bears' 41–17 win over the Jacksonville Jaguars in Week 16, Smith intercepted Mike Glennon twice to become the first Bears player with multiple interceptions in a game since Ha Ha Clinton-Dix in 2019. Smith was also the team's first linebacker to achieve the feat since Lance Briggs in 2008. The Bears made it back to the playoffs, for the second time in Smith's career. However, he was inactive in their appearance, a 21–9 loss against the New Orleans Saints, after suffering an elbow injury in the final game of the season.

After the season he was elected for the first time to the Sporting News first-team All-Pro team that was voted on by NFL players and executives, and to Associated Press's second-team All-Pro.

2021 season
On April 27, 2021, the Bears exercised the fifth-year option on Smith's contract, which guarantees a salary of $9.7 million for the 2022 season. On September 19, Smith intercepted a pass by Joe Burrow and returned it 53 yards for a touchdown in a 20–17 win against the Cincinnati Bengals. On November 8, Smith recorded a sack alongside 12 total tackles in a 29–27 Monday Night Football loss which saw the Bears fall to a 3–6 record on the season. On November 21, Smith recorded a career-high total of 17 tackles, two of which were tackles for losses, in a 16–14 loss to the Baltimore Ravens. It was the most tackles by a Bears player in a single game since Brian Urlacher had 19 in 2006. Smith finished the season with one interception and 163 total tackles, the fifth-most in the NFL. He was named to NFL.com's All-Pro team and the Associated Press' second team All-Pro.

2022 season
In early August 2022, Smith announced that while he tried to negotiate a contract extension during the offseason, he has requested the Bears trade him stating the reason being the "new front office regime doesn't value me here." Smith did report to Bears' training camp, but refused to practice. On August 20, Smith ended his hold out from practices and stated he would no longer continue negotiating with the Bears' front office for the remainder of the 2022 season. On September 25, Smith recorded 16 total tackles, two tackles for loss, and an interception, during a 23–20 win over the Houston Texans.

Baltimore Ravens
On October 31, 2022, Smith was traded to the Baltimore Ravens for A. J. Klein, a 2023 second round pick, and a 2023 fifth round pick. On January 10, 2023, Smith signed a five-year, $100 million extension with the Ravens, including $45 million fully guaranteed with $60 million in total guarantees, making him the highest-paid off-ball linebacker in the league.

NFL career statistics

Regular season

Playoffs

Personal life
On May 8, 2018, nearly two weeks after being drafted, it was reported that Smith's car was burglarized in Athens, Georgia, where a team-issued iPad along with some of Smith's personal belongings, including his college jerseys, helmet, and awards were stolen from his car. However, the next day, the stolen items were recovered.

References

External links

 Georgia Bulldogs bio
 Baltimore Ravens bio

1997 births
Living people
All-American college football players
American football linebackers
Baltimore Ravens players
Chicago Bears players
Georgia Bulldogs football players
People from Montezuma, Georgia
Players of American football from Georgia (U.S. state)
Ed Block Courage Award recipients
American Conference Pro Bowl players
Brian Piccolo Award winners